Diamantina Lakes is a locality in the Shire of Diamantina, Queensland, Australia.

Geography 
Diamantina Lakes is part of the Channel Country which is an arid landscape with a series of ancient flood plains from rivers which only flow intermittently. When there is water in it, the Diamantina River flows from north to south through the locality eventually destined for Lake Eyre in South Australia. However, the water usually is absorbed into the earth or evaporates before reaching Lake Eyre.

Heritage listings 
The heritage listings for Diamantina Lakes includes:

 Elizabeth Springs, an artesian spring from the Great Artesian Basin

References

External links

 
Shire of Diamantina
Localities in Queensland